Harold Bushnell Sallada (January 23, 1895  April 25, 1977) was a admiral and naval aviator in the United States Navy. He served in the US navy as a vice admiral and retired from the service in October 1949 as a four star admiral. Before his retirement, he was assigned commander United States Pacific Fleet at San Diego.

Biography 
Sallada was born on January 23, 1895, in Williamsport, Pennsylvania, and later moved to Arlington, Texas. He graduated from the United States Naval Academy in 1917 and the Naval War College, and became a naval aviator in 1921. His was first appointment as commander USS Albemarle (AV-5) in 1941 until he was promoted to the rank of captain with the second assignment as director of Bureau of Aeronautics for Plans Division on August 23, 1942. He was promoted to the rank of rear admiral in 1944 and subsequently was assigned commander Carrier Division 26. In the same year from 24 July to 1 August 1944, he commanded five escort carriers in the Battle of Tinian. He also commanded Carrier Division 6. As a rear admiral, he appointed as the chief of the Bureau of Aeronautics. During his assignment at the Bureau of Aeronautics, he played a central role for the development of slant-deck aircraft carriers.

Later work 
After retirement, he joined Fairchild Engine and Airplane Corp. and worked at its aircraft division as a manager of the Chicago plant. In 1952, he became vice president and a member of the board of directors at Chance Vought Aircraft, Inc. until he retired in 1960.

References 

1895 births
1977 deaths
People from Williamsport, Pennsylvania
People from Arlington, Texas
United States Navy vice admirals
United States Naval Academy alumni
Naval War College alumni
Recipients of the Legion of Merit
Recipients of the Navy and Marine Corps Medal
Military personnel from Texas
Military personnel from Pennsylvania